Life Is Sweet (foaled March 5, 2005, in Kentucky) is an American Thoroughbred racehorse who in early 2009 was thought to be a threat to her unbeaten stablemate, Zenyatta, after winning three straight stakes races. Though beaten by Zenyatta.

Background
Life Is Sweet was bred by her owners, Pam & Martin Wygod. By leading sire Storm Cat, she is out of the Kris S. mare Sweet Life, who is also the dam of champion juvenile filly Sweet Catomine. Sweet Life would be named the 2009 Kentucky Broodmare of the Year.

Life Is Sweet originally raced on the east coast with Hall of Fame trainer Bill Mott, but at age four was transferred to the California-based barn of John Shirreffs, best known as the trainer of Zenyatta.

Racing career
Life Is Sweet made her debut as a two-year-old at Saratoga on August 30, 2007, finishing eighth. On October 7, she made her second start, this time at Belmont on the turf, and won by a commanding nine lengths. She was next entered in the Epitome Breeders' Cup Stakes on October 27 but finished sixth.

Life Is Sweet did not run again until an allowance race at Gulfstream Park on February 22, 2008, which she won. On April 5, she faced Grade 1 company for the first time in the Ashland Stakes, finishing fourth. She then ran second in both the Calder Oaks on April 26 and Sand Point Stakes on May 31.

Life Is Sweet did not return to racing until January 18, 2009 in the El Encino Stakes at Santa Anita. Now trained by Shirreffs, she settled behind horses for the first  miles, then swung four wide around the turn to get running room. In the stretch, she pulled to the lead and won by  lengths. Her next start was the La Canada Stakes on February 15, for which she was made the 6-5 favorite. She once again settled near the back of the field until swinging wide on the final turn, finally gaining the lead near the finish line to win by  lengths. Although the opening fractions were quite slow, Life Is Sweet ran the last eighth of a mile in a very quick 11.20 seconds. Jockey Garrett Gomez said, "She really showed a great turn of foot and to be able to overcome that slow pace like she did is amazing. You can see her stride gets longer as she gets closer to the wire."

On March 14, she faced her biggest test yet in the Grade 1 Santa Margarita Invitational, where she was the even money favorite. The race was nearly a carbon copy of her two previous wins, with Life Is Sweet starting her winning move around the far turn to eventually win by  lengths.

Life Is Sweet's next start was the Milady Handicap on May 23, in which her stablemate Zenyatta was making her season debut. The two raced in fifth and sixth down the backstretch and started their moves around the far turn. Zenyatta outkicked Life Is Sweet to win by  lengths, with Life Is Sweet in second.

Life is Sweet then faced off with males in the Hollywood Gold Cup on July 11. In a large field of 13, she was trapped behind horses until they entered the stretch, where she closed from 11th to 3rd. She then finished fourth behind Zenyatta in both the Clement L. Hirsch on August 9 and the Lady's Secret on October 10. A slow pace in both races compromised her attempt to come from behind in the stretch. 
 
On November 6, 2009, Life Is Sweet came into her own with a runaway win in the Breeders' Cup Ladies Classic. She broke poorly and got pinched by other horses, but soon settled near the back of the pack. On the far turn, she circled wide of the field and drew off to a convincing win. "I’m just so happy for Life is Sweet," said Shirreffs. “She’s such a nice filly. She ran so great early in the year. I was glad she was able to get it done today. She really deserves this."

Life is Sweet finished second to Zenyatta in the Eclipse Award voting for champion older mare of 2009.

Life Is Sweet's last race was on February 13, 2010, when she finished second in the Santa Maria Handicap. On March 13, she was preparing for a run in the Dubai World Cup; however, after the workout, she suffered muscle cramps and owner Marty Wygod decided to retire her. Wygod said, "If she can't run at her best, I don't want to. [Shirreffs] got her right for the Breeders' Cup. She was compromised in most of her races because of her tying up. We don't want to take a risk with her."

Retirement
She was bred to Smart Strike and foaled a colt in March 2011. The colt, later named Disintermediate, was euthanized after fracturing a pastern during a workout at Golden Gate in December 2013. She also has a 2012 Bernardini filly named Sweet Promises and a 2013 filly named Lady Pamela by Tapit.

Pedigree

References

 Life Is Sweet profile and race video at Breeders' Cup.com

2005 racehorse births
Racehorses bred in Kentucky
Racehorses trained in the United States
Thoroughbred family 21
Breeders' Cup Distaff winners